The 2001 Majorca Open was a men's tennis tournament played on outdoor clay courts in Majorca, Spain and was part of the International Series of the 2001 ATP Tour. It was the seventh edition of the tournament and ran from April 30 through May 6, 2001. Unseeded Alberto Martín won the singles title.

Finals

Singles

 Alberto Martín defeated  Guillermo Coria 6–3, 3–6, 6–2
 It was Martin's only title of the year and the 4th of his career.

Doubles

 Donald Johnson /  Jared Palmer defeated  Feliciano López /  Francisco Roig 7–5, 6–3
 It was Johnson's 4th title of the year and the 18th of his career. It was Palmer's 3rd title of the year and the 20th of his career.

References

External links
 ATP tournament profile

 
Majorca Open